The following elections occurred in the year 1932.

Asia
 1932 Japanese general election

Europe
 1932 Irish general election
 1932 Swedish general election
 1932 Estonian parliamentary election
 1932 French legislative election
 1932 Belgian general election
 1932 Catalan regional election

Denmark
 1932 Danish Folketing election
 1932 Danish Landsting election

Greece
 1932 Greek Senate election
 1932 Greek legislative election

Germany
 1932 German presidential election
 July 1932 German federal election
 November 1932 German federal election

United Kingdom
 1932 Cardiganshire by-election
 1932 North Cornwall by-election
 1932 Croydon South by-election
 1932 Dulwich by-election
 1932 Eastbourne by-election
 1932 Henley by-election
 1932 Twickenham by-election
 1932 Wednesbury by-election
 1932 Westminster Abbey by-election

North America

Canada
 1932 Edmonton municipal election
 1932 Manitoba general election
 1932 Newfoundland general election
 1932 Ottawa municipal election
 1932 Toronto municipal election

United States
 1932 United States presidential election
 United States House of Representatives elections in California, 1932
 1932 Louisiana gubernatorial election
 1932 Minnesota gubernatorial election
 1932 New York state election
 United States House of Representatives elections in South Carolina, 1932
 1932 United States House of Representatives elections

United States Senate
 1932 United States Senate elections
 United States Senate election in South Carolina, 1932

South America
 1932 Chilean presidential election
 1932 Honduran general election
 1932 Nicaraguan general election
 1932 Panamanian general election
 1932 Salvadoran legislative election

Oceania
 1932 Motueka by-election
 1932 Southern Maori by-election

Australia
 1932 Queensland state election

See also
 :Category:1932 elections

1932
Elections